Willy Haeberli (June 17, 1925 – October 4, 2021) was a Swiss-American physicist and Professor Emeritus of Physics at the University of Wisconsin, Madison. He was known for his works in nuclear physics. He was a winner of the Tom W. Bonner Prize in Nuclear Physics and of the Humboldt Prize.

References

1925 births
2021 deaths
Swiss physicists
American physicists
Nuclear physicists
University of Wisconsin–Madison alumni
Fellows of the American Physical Society